Support Your Local Sheriff! (also known as The Sheriff) is a 1969 American comedy Western film directed by Burt Kennedy and starring James Garner, Joan Hackett, and Walter Brennan. The supporting cast features Harry Morgan, Jack Elam, Bruce Dern, and Chubby Johnson. The picture was distributed by United Artists and produced by William Bowers (who also wrote the screenplay) and Bill Finnegan.

The film is a parody of a common Western trope: the selfless, rugged stranger who tames a lawless frontier town. Its title was derived from a popular 1960s campaign slogan: "Support Your Local Police".

Plot
The Old West town of Calendar in the Colorado Territory springs up almost overnight when clumsy, hotheaded Prudy Perkins (Hackett) notices gold in a freshly dug grave during a funeral. Her father, bumbling farmer Olly (Morgan), becomes the first mayor of the new settlement, but soon he and the other elected councilmen (Henry Jones and Walter Burke) find themselves and the townspeople at the mercy of the corrupt Danby family, who force the prospectors to pay them a toll for using the only road in or out of Calendar. The town has no sheriff, as all the men are busy searching for gold, and the few who have taken the job have been run out of town or killed.

Jason McCullough (Garner), a confident and exceptionally skilled gunfighter planning to emigrate to Australia, sees Joe Danby (Dern) kill a man over a card game in the town's saloon. Needing money after Calendar's high prices leave him broke, McCullough takes the job of sheriff, impressing the mayor and council with his uncanny marksmanship. He breaks up a street brawl and becomes attracted to Prudy, despite her attempts to avoid him due to the embarrassing circumstances under which they first met. McCullough arrests Joe and tosses him in the town's unfinished jail, which lacks bars for the cell doors and windows; he uses several clever tricks to manipulate Joe and keep him from escaping.

McCullough acquires a reluctant deputy in scruffy stable boy Jake (Elam), previously known as the "town character". Joe's arrest infuriates his father, Pa Danby (Brennan), who is not accustomed to his family being challenged. After McCullough disarms and humiliates him in a failed intimidation attempt, Pa sends in a string of hired guns to kill him, all of whom the sheriff easily defeats. Meanwhile, McCullough enlists Jake's help in an unsuccessful attempt to prospect for gold, and spars romantically with Prudy. The Danbys try to tear the bars off the jail window with their horses but get pulled off their mounts instead before Jake chases them away with a shotgun.

A fed-up Pa enlists all of his relatives to ride into town and free his son. When the news reaches McCullough, he initially tells Prudy he intends to leave, but when she expresses her sincere approval of this sensible idea, he declares it to be cowardly and announces he is staying instead. Mayor Perkins persuades the townsfolk to vote against helping the sheriff despite Prudy trying to convince them otherwise. Thus, the Danby clan rides in faced only by McCullough, Jake, and Prudy. After a lengthy but unproductive gunfight, McCullough bluffs his way to victory using Joe as a hostage and the old cannon mounted in the center of town. As the Danbys are marched off to jail, the supposedly unloaded cannon fires, smashing the local brothel and scattering both the prostitutes and the councilmen they were servicing.

McCullough and Prudy get engaged. In a closing monologue, Jake breaks the film's fourth wall and directly informs the audience that after his wedding, McCollough went on to a long and prosperous career as the first governor of Colorado after it became a state, never making it to Australia (although he reads about it a lot), while Jake takes his place as sheriff of Calendar and becomes "one of the most beloved characters in Western folklore".

Cast

 James Garner as Jason McCullough
 Joan Hackett as Prudy Perkins
 Walter Brennan as Pa Danby
 Harry Morgan as Olly Perkins
 Jack Elam as Jake
 Henry Jones as Henry Jackson
 Bruce Dern as Joe Danby   
 Willis Bouchey as Thomas Devery
 Kathleen Freeman as Mrs. Danvers 
 Walter Burke as Fred Johnson
 Chubby Johnson as Brady 
 Gene Evans as Tom Danby
 Dick Peabody as Luke Danby
 Dick Haynes as Bartender

Production
Support Your Local Sheriff! was the first producing effort by Garner and his  Cherokee production company, completed on a "shoestring" budget of $750,000. Early in pre-production, Paramount Pictures threatened a lawsuit as the studio contended that the first scene was "lifted" from their musical Paint Your Wagon (1969) where a similar gold mine discovery is featured. Eventually, Garner was able to show where the original screenplay had found its source material, and the lawsuit went away.

Reception
Support Your Local Sheriff was considered a "bomb", as it did not do any business in its first week, with United Artists clamoring to pull the film. Garner challenged them to match a $10,000 stake to keep the film in one theatre for a week. The result was impressive as "word of mouth" increased attendance until  crowds were around the theatre by the end of the engagement. Support Your Local Sheriff was the 20th-most popular film at the U.S. box office in 1969.

Support Your Local Sheriff received mixed critical reviews. It holds a 75% rating on Rotten Tomatoes based on sixteen reviews.

Follow-up
In 1971, director Burt Kennedy reteamed with James Garner, Harry Morgan, and Jack Elam to make another Western comedy, Support Your Local Gunfighter, with different characters, but a similar comedic tone. Many of the original supporting cast reappeared, as well.

See also
 List of American films of 1969

References

Notes

Citations

Further reading

 Garner, James and John Winokur. The Garner Files: A Memoir. New York: Simon & Schuster, 2011. .

External links

 
 
 
 
 James Garner Interview on the Charlie Rose Show

1969 films
1960s Western (genre) comedy films
American Western (genre) comedy films
American parody films
1960s parody films
Films directed by Burt Kennedy
Films shot in Los Angeles
Films set in Colorado
1969 comedy films
1960s English-language films
1960s American films